Syddjurs municipality is a municipality (Danish, kommune) in Region Midtjylland in Denmark just north of Aarhus and is a part of the Aarhus area. It covers an area of 696.7 km² and has a  population of 43,596 (1. January 2022).

On 1 January 2007 Syddjurs municipality ("South Djursland") was created as the result of Kommunalreformen ("The Municipal Reform" of 2007), consisting of the former municipalities of Ebeltoft, Midtdjurs, Rosenholm, and Rønde. The municipality covers most of southern Djursland, Skødshoved, Helgenæs, Mols and the Ebeltoft peninsula.

The municipality is part of Business Region Aarhus and of the East Jutland metropolitan area, which had a total population of 1.378 million in 2016.

Locations

Politics

Municipal council
Syddjurs' municipal council consists of 27 members, elected every four years.

Below are the municipal councils elected since the Municipal Reform of 2007.

Sources
 Municipal statistics: NetBorger Kommunefakta, delivered from KMD aka Kommunedata (Municipal Data)
 Municipal mergers and neighbors: Eniro new municipalities map

References

External links 

  

 

 
Municipalities of the Central Denmark Region
Municipalities of Denmark
Populated places established in 2007